Aeglopsis is a genus of flowering plants belonging to the family Rutaceae.

Its native range is Tropical Africa.

Species:
 Aeglopsis beguei A.Chev. 
 Aeglopsis chevalieri Swingle 
 Aeglopsis eggelingii M.Taylor 
 Aeglopsis mangenotii A.Chev.

References

Aurantioideae
Aurantioideae genera